Wilson School is a historic one room school building at Clear Spring, Washington County, Maryland, United States. It is a rectangular brick building, one room wide and three bays deep above a random rubble limestone foundation, built by merchant Rufus Wilson, 1859–1860. The school is representative of a vernacular interpretation of the Greek Revival style. It was incorporated into the county's public education system in the 1890s and remained in use until it closed in 1950, the last operating one-room school in Washington County.

The Wilson School was listed on the National Register of Historic Places in 1998.

References

External links
, including undated photo, at Maryland Historical Trust

School buildings on the National Register of Historic Places in Maryland
Buildings and structures in Washington County, Maryland
Defunct schools in Maryland
One-room schoolhouses in Maryland
Schoolhouses in the United States
School buildings completed in 1860
National Register of Historic Places in Washington County, Maryland
1860 establishments in Maryland